Veeru Krishnan (1959-7 September 2019) was an Indian actor and Kathak dancer.

Biography
Krishnan acted in films. He also taught Kathak to actors like Priyanka Chopra, Katrina Kaif, Karanvir Bohra and Athiya Shetty learnt Kathak from him. He acted in films like Akele Hum Akele Tum, Hum Hain Rahi Pyar Ke, Raja Hindustani, Ishq and Dulhe Raja.

Krishnan died in Mumbai on 7 September 2019.

Selected filmography

 Hum Hain Rahi Pyar Ke (1993) as Natrajan 
 Tadipaar (1993)
 Raja (1995) as neighbour
 Akele Hum Akele Tum (1995)
 Raja Hindustani (1996) as Gulab Singh
 Agnee Morcha (1997)
 Ishq (1997)
 Zor (1998) as 
 Dulhe Raja (1998) as Dance Master ji 
 Pyaar Koi Khel Nahin (1999) as Hijra/Transgender
 Maa Kasam (1999) as Acharya Servant
 Mela (2000) as Ghungroo, the Dance Master
Kranti (2002)  as Police Inspector Ghorpade 
 Akhiyon Se Goli Maare (2002)
Khullam Khulla Pyaar Karen (2005) as Sindhi's customer
 Kajraare (2010)

References

External links

Male actors in Hindi cinema
Indian male film actors
Indian male dancers
2019 deaths
1959 births